Sermamagny is a commune in the Territoire de Belfort department in Bourgogne-Franche-Comté in northeastern France.

See also

 Communes of the Territoire de Belfort department
 Eurockéennes

References

External links
  

Communes of the Territoire de Belfort